The men's 5000 metres races of the 2013–14 ISU Speed Skating World Cup 6, arranged in the Thialf arena, in Heerenveen, Netherlands, was held on 16 March 2014.

Jorrit Bergsma of the Netherlands won the race, while Jan Blokhuijsen of the Netherlands came second, and Aleksandr Rumyantsev of Russia came third.

Result
The race took place on Saturday, 16 March, scheduled at 14:13.

Division A

References

Men 5000
6